Coya Asarpay or Azarpay (died 1533), was a princess and queen consort of the Inca Empire by marriage to her brother, the Sapa Inca Atahualpa (r 1532-1533).

Asarpay was the daughter of the Inca Huayna Capac. She was the "First Princess of the Empire", and her sisters were Kispe Sisa, Kura Okllu, Marca Chimbo, Pachacuti Yamqui, Miro, Kusi Warkay, Francisca Coya and others.:112

She married her brother, the succeeding Inca, in accordance with ancient custom. 

Her husband was executed in 1533 by the Spaniards accused of incest and idolatry, charges which would apply also to her. Pedro Pizarro reports, that she was executed by garroting on the order of Francisco Pizarro.

References

Inca royal consorts
16th-century births
1533 deaths
16th-century indigenous people of the Americas
16th-century women
Murdered royalty
Spanish colonization of the Americas
Indigenous people of the Andes
People executed by strangulation
Murder in 1533